The Norwegian Academy of Science and Letters has about 880 members.

There are classes for Sciences and Letters, respectively, and also subgroups within them. The subgroups are further classified into so-called "ordinary members" and members over 70 years old, because 70 is the retirement age in Norway.

Members are elected to the society for lifetime. The maximum number of ordinary members is 140 Norwegian and 100 foreign members for the Mathematics and sciences class, and 110 Norwegian and 60 foreign members for the Letters class. Positions for new members are available when an ordinary member dies or passes the 70 years age limit.

Sciences

Mathematics

Norwegian
Fred Espen Benth
Birgitte Freiesleben de Blasio
Bjørn Ian Dundas
Ingrid Kristine Glad 
John Grue
Nils Lid Hjort
Helge Holden
Eugenia Malinnikova
Hans Munthe-Kaas
Kristian Ranestad
Nils Henrik Risebro
John Rognes
Håvard Rue
Kristian Seip
Karsten Trulsen
Marit B. Veierød
Ørnulf Borgan (over 70 years old)
Kristian B. Dysthe (over 70 years)
Geir Ellingsrud (over 70 years)
Steinar Engen (over 70 years)
Odd Magnus Faltinsen (over 70 years)
John Erik Fornæss (over 70 years)
Arnfinn Laudal (over 70 years)
Knut Liestøl (over 70 years)
Tom Lyche (over 70 years)
Dag Normann (over 70 years)
Ragni Piene (over 70 years)
Idun Reiten (over 70 years)
Tore Schweder (over 70 years)
Sverre O. Smalø (over 70 years))
Erling Størmer (over 70 years))
Dag Tjøstheim (over 70 years)
Sigve Tjøtta (over 70 years)
Ragnar Winther (over 70 years)
Bernt Øksendal (over 70 years)
Odd Aalen (over 70 years)
Stål Aanderaa (over 70 years)

Foreign
Douglas N. Arnold
Fedor Fomin
Arnoldo Frigessi
Avi Wigderson
Andrew Wiles
John Ball (over 70 years old)
David Ross Brillinger (over 70 years)
Lennart Carleson (over 70 years)
Elaine Cohen (over 70 years)
Alain Connes (over 70 years)
Pierre René Deligne (over 70 years)
Ivar Ekeland (over 70 years)
Björn Engquist (over 70 years)
Hillel Furstenberg (over 70 years)
Mikhail Gromov (over 70 years)

Steven Kleiman (over 70 years)
Donald Knuth (over 70 years)
Robert Langlands (over 70 years)
Peter D. Lax (over 70 years)
László Lovász (over 70 years)
Gregory Margulis (over 70 years)
Yves Meyer (over 70 years)
John Willard Milnor (over 70 years)
David B. Mumford (over 70 years)
John Nicholas Newman (over 70 years)
Jacob Palis (over 70 years)
Christian Peskine (over 70 years)
Richard Riesenfeld (over 70 years)
Larry L. Schumaker (over 70 years)
Jean-Pierre Serre (over 70 years)
Melvyn A. Shapiro (over 70 years)
Yakov G. Sinai (over 70 years)
Dennis Parnell Sullivan (over 70 years)
Endre Szemerédi (over 70 years)
John G. Thompson (over 70 years)
Howell Tong (over 70 years)
Karen Uhlenbeck (over 70 years)
S. R. Srinivasa Varadhan (over 70 years)

Physics, astronomy and geophysics

Norwegian
Arne Brataas
Tor Eldevik
Øystein Elgarøy
Hans Kristian Kamfjord Eriksen
Carmen Gaina
Alex Hansen
Viggo H. Hansteen
Christoph Heinze
Morten Hjorth-Jensen
Ann-Cecilie Larsen
Per Barth Lilje
Anders Malthe-Sørenssen
Cecilie Mauritzen
Jøran Moen
Alexander L. Read
Sunniva Siem
Steinar Stapnes
Asle Sudbø
Trond Helge Torsvik
Susanne Viefers
Stephanie C. Werner
Kaare Aksnes (over 70 years)
László Pál Csernai (over 70 years)
Alv Egeland (over 70 years)
Oddbjørn Engvold (over 70 years)
Arne Foldvik (over 70 years)
Kristian Fossheim (over 70 years)
Bjørn Gjevik (over 70 years)

Øystein Hov (over 70 years)
Hallstein Høgåsen (over 70 years)

Ola M. Johannessen (over 70 years)
Tom Henning Johansen (over 70 years)
Torstein F. Jøssang (over 70 years)
Yngve Kristoffersen (over 70 years)
Egil Leer (over 70 years)
Jon Magne Leinaas (over 70 years)
Johan E. Moan (over 70 years)
Eivind Osnes (over 70 years)
Hans Pécseli (over 70 years)
Kaare Pedersen (over 70 years)
Finn Ravndal (over 70 years)
John Bernhard Rekstad (over 70 years)
Per Arne Rikvold (over 70 years)
Svein Sjøberg (over 70 years)
Arne Torbjørn Skjeltorp (over 70 years)
Jan K. Trulsen (over 70 years)
Jan Erik Weber (over 70 years)

Foreign
Boris Altshuler
Michael Edwards Brown
Mats Carlsson
Deliang Chen
Bart De Pontieu
Winfried Denk
Donald M. Eigler
Mike C. Gurnis
Stefan Hell
David Jewitt
Jane Luu
Yuri Y. Podladchikov
Ewine van Dishoeck
Amnon Aharony (over 70 years)
Jens Aage Als-Nielsen (over 70 years)
James Roger Prior Angel (over 70 years)
Gerd Binning (over 70 years)
Guy Pierre Brasseur (over 70 years)
Herbert C. Carlson (over 70 years)
Sierd Cloetingh (over 70 years)
John Culhane (over 70 years)
Peter A. Davies (over 70 years)
Ora Entin-Wohlman (over 70 years)
Andrew C. Fabian (over 70 years)
Ryoichi Fujii (over 70 years)
Iouri Galperine (over 70 years)
Christoph Gerber (over 70 years)
Lars Gottschalk (over 70 years)
David Gubbins (over 70 years)
Bengt Gustafsson (over 70 years)
Alan H. Guth (over 70 years)
Maximilian Haider (over 70 years)
Thors Hans Hansson (over 70 years)
Thomas E. Holzer (over 70 years)

Sumio Iijima (over 70 years)

Cecilia Jarlskog (over 70 years)
Ondrej Krivanek (over 70 years)
Per Olof Lindblad (over 70 years)
Andrei Linde (over 70 years)
Ulf G. Lindström (over 70 years)
Richard Lindzen (over 70 years)
William Charles Livingston (over 70 years)
Paul Meakin (over 70 years)

Holger Bech Nielsen (over 70 years)
Per-Åke Nordlund (over 70 years)
William Richard Peltier (over 70 years)
John Brian Pendry (over 70 years)
Michael John Prather (over 70 years)
Eric Priest (over 70 years)
Erling Pytte (over 70 years)
Martin Rees (over 70 years)
Robert Rosner (over 70 years)
Hans Thomas Rossby (over 70 years)
Göran Scharmer (over 70 years)
Maarten Schmidt (over 70 years)
Alexey Starobinskiy (over 70 years)
Robert F. Stein (over 70 years)
Jan Olof Stenflo (over 70 years)
Erik Hilding Sundqvist (over 70 years)
Kip S. Thorne (over 70 years)
Knut Urban (over 70 years)
Valerii Vinokur (over 70 years)

Wang Wei-Chyung (over 70 years)
Rainer Weiss (over 70 years)

Christos S. Zerefos (over 70 years)

Geosciences

Norwegian
Elisabeth Alve
Karin Andreassen
Jan Inge Faleide
Hope Jahren
Bjørn Jamtveit
Eystein Jansen
Andreas Max Kääb
Anna Nele Meckler
Rolf Birger Pedersen
John Inge Svendsen
Chong-Yu Xu
Knut Olav Bjørlykke (over 70 years)
Anders Elverhøi (over 70 years)
Roy Helge Gabrielsen (over 70 years)
Magne Helvig (over 70 years)
Eystein Husebye (over 70 years)
Kaare Høeg (over 70 years)
Jan Mangerud (over 70 years)
Bjørn Olav Mysen (over 70 years)
Else-Ragnhild Neumann (over 70 years)
Ivar B. Ramberg (over 70 years)
Per Aagaard (over 70 years)

Foreign
Stephen Larter
Kristin Vala Ragnarsdottir
Wim Spakman
Bernhard Steinberger
Hans Thybo
John T. Andrews (over 70 years)
Ewald Glässer (over 70 years)
William Griffin(over 70 years)
Stein Bjørnar Jacobsen (over 70 years)
Suzanne Lacasse (over 70 years)
Kurt Lambeck (over 70 years)
Gifford H. Miller (over 70 years)
Keith O'Nions (over 70 years)
Suzanne O'Reilly (over 70 years)
Olav Slaymaker (over 70 years)
Scott B. Smithson (over 70 years)
Manik Talwani (over 70 years)
Jörn Thiede (over 70 years)
Jacques Touret (over 70 years)
Peter Richard Vogt (over 70 years)
Marjorie Wilson (over 70 years)

Chemistry

Norwegian
Knut J. Børve
Thomas Ebbesen
Mari-Ann Einarsrud
Helmer Fjellvåg
Tor Grande
Trygve Ulf Helgaker
Karl Petter Lillerud
Elsa Lundanes
Truls Eivind Norby
Unni Olsbye 
Kenneth Ruud
Sigurd Skogestad
Mats Tilset
Einar Uggerud
Rolf David Vogt
Knut Fægri, Jr. (over 70 years)
Tyge Greibrokk (over 70 years)
Arne Haaland (over 70 years)
Per Hoff (over 70 years)
Signe H. Kjelstrup (over 70 years)

Lars Skattebøl (over 70 years)
Leiv Kristen Sydnes (over 70 years)
Harald Arnljot Øye (over 70 years)

Foreign
Jürgen Gauss 
Kevin C. Jones
Willem M. Klopper
Louis E. Brus (over 70 years)
Odile Eisenstein (over 70 years)
Hans-Heinz Emons (over 70 years)
Georgiy V. Girichev (over 70 years)
István Hargittai (over 70 years)
Henning Hopf (over 70 years)

Armin de Meijere (over 70 years)
Claus Jørgen Nielsen (over 70 years)
Bengt Nordén (over 70 years)
Bo Nyström (over 70 years)

Reiner Salzer (over 70 years)
Nadrian C. Seeman (over 70 years)

Barry Welch (over 70 years)

Biology

Norwegian
Dag Lorents Aksnes
Inger Greve Alsos
Ottar Nordal Bjørnstad
Christian Brochmann
Anne Krag Brysting
Bente Edvardsen
Anders Goksøyr
Dag Olav Hessen
Rolf Anker Ims
Kjetill S. Jakobsen
Atle Mysterud
Stig William Omholt
Anne Gro Salvanes
Bernt-Erik Sæther
Vigdis Vandvik
Leif Asbjørn Vøllestad
Nigel Gilles Yoccoz
Lise Øvreås
Ingvild Austad (over 70 years)
Arnoldus Schytte Blix (over 70 years)
Kåre Fossum (over 70 years)
Odd Halvorsen (over 70 years)
Ola M. Heide (over 70 years)
Per Magnus Jørgensen (over 70 years)
Thor Landsverk (over 70 years)
Hanna Mustaparta (over 70 years)
Inger Nafstad (over 70 years)
Per Nissen (over 70 years)
Inger Nordal (over 70 years)
Leif Ryvarden (over 70 years)
Jan Raa (over 70 years)
Egil Sakshaug (over 70 years)
Tore Slagsvold (over 70 years)
Nils Christian Stenseth (over 70 years)

Lauritz Sverdrup Sømme (over 70 years)
Tron Frede Thingstad (over 70 years)
Kåre Olav Venn (over 70 years)

Foreign
Hans Ellegren
James Elser
Jan Mulder
Göran Erik Nilsson
Loren H. Rieseberg
Eörs Szathmáry
Pierre Taberlet
Katherine J. Willis
Zhang Zhibin
Teuvo Tapio Ahti (over 70 years)
Richard William Battarbee (over 70 years)
Hilary H. Birks (over 70 years)
John Birks (over 70 years)

Edward P. Cunningham (over 70 years)
Zbigniew Duda (over 70 years)

Tom Fenchel (over 70 years)
Else Marie Friis (over 70 years)

John G. Hildebrand (over 70 years)

Pétur Mikkel Jónasson (over 70 years)
Bengt Jonsell (over 70 years)
Olavi Junttila (over 70 years)
Charles J. Krebs (over 70 years)
Yvon Le Maho (over 70 years)
Björn Hadar Lindqvist (over 70 years)
Walter Jami Lusigi (over 70 years)
Geoffrey M. O. Maloiy (over 70 years)

David Pegler (over 70 years)
Tamás Pócs (over 70 years)

Jon Swenson (over 70 years)

Iain Thornton (over 70 years)
Philip Bernard Tinker (over 70 years)

Cell and molecular biology

Norwegian
Magnar Bjørås
Heidi Kiil Blomhoff
Rune Blomhoff
Vincent Eijsink
Terje Espevik
Anders Fjose
Kristian Gundersen
Terje Johansen
Arne Klungland
Vessela Kristensen
James Bradley Lorens
Ragnhild A. Lothe
Per Eystein Lønning
Hilde Loge Nilsen
Ørjan Olsvik
Kristian Prydz
Inger Sandlie
Anne Simonsen
Kirsten Skarstad
Harald Stenmark
Kjetil Taskén
Reidunn Aalen
Haakon Breien Benestad (over 70 years)
Trond Berg (over 70 years)
Erik Boye (over 70 years)
Anne-Lise Børresen-Dale (over 70 years)
Stein Ove Døskeland (over 70 years)
Sigbjørn Fossum (over 70 years)
Odd Stokke Gabrielsen (over 70 years)
Kaare Gautvik (over 70 years)
Per Einar Granum (over 70 years)
Vidar Hansson (over 70 years)
Karen B. Helle (over 70 years)
Anne-Brit Kolstø (over 70 years)
Ingolf Figved Nes (over 70 years)
Olav Sand (over 70 years)
Kirsten Sandvig (over 70 years)
Per Ottar Seglen (over 70 years)
Reidun Sirevåg (over 70 years)

Foreign
David Ian Attwell
Cornelia Bargmann
Phillippe Collas
Ray Dingledine
Carl-Henrik Heldin
David Julius
Aurora Martínez
Jacques Neefjes
Ardem Patapoutian
Richard H. Scheller
John Donald Scott
Raymond Charles Stevens
Mark Achtman (over 70 years old)
Dominique Aunis (over 70 years)
J. Donald Capra (over 70 years)
R. John Collier (over 70 years)

Ford Doolittle (over 70 years)
Ann Martin Graybiel (over 70 years)
Gareth Griffiths (over 70 years)
Angela Gronenborn (over 70 years)
Tomas Lindahl (over 70 years)
Linda K. Medlin (over 70 years)
Kenneth Nilsson (over 70 years)
Bjørn Reino Olsen (over 70 years)
James E. Rothman (over 70 years)

Medicine

Norwegian
Lars A. Akslen
Mahmood Reza Amiry-Moghaddam
Ole A. Andreassen
Linda Hildegard Bergersen
Øyvind S. Bruland
Farrukh Abbas Chaudhry
Niels Christian Danbolt
Marianne Fyhn
Eva Gerdts
Sigrun Halvorsen
Anne Husebekk
Jan Haavik
Tom Hemming Karlsen
Nina Langeland
Edvard Moser
May-Britt Moser
Pål Rasmus Njølstad
Johanna Olweus
Ole Petter Ottersen
Rolf Kåre Reed
Helga Refsum
John-Arne Røttingen
Truls Raastad
Erlend B. Smeland
Ludvig Sollid
Anne Spurkland
Camilla Stoltenberg
Tone Tønjum
Dag Erik Undlien
Giske Ursin
Pål Aukrust (over 70 years)
Oddmund Bakke (over 70 years)
Bjarne Bogen (over 70 years)
Gro Harlem Brundtland (over 70 years)
Stein Arne Evensen (over 70 years)
Frode Fonnum (over 70 years)
Stig Frøland (over 70 years)
Gunnar Husby (over 70 years)
Herman Høst (over 70 years)
John Kjekshus (over 70 years)
Einar Kringlen (over 70 years)
Hans Einar Krokan (over 70 years)
Øivind Larsen (over 70 years)
Sverre O. Lie (over 70 years)
Ole Didrik Lærum (over 70 years)
Terje Lømo (over 70 years)
Gunnar Nicolaysen (over 70 years)
Rolf Nyberg-Hansen (over 70 years)
Kirsten Kjelsberg Osen (over 70 years)
Jan Ivar Pedersen (over 70 years)
Ola Didrik Saugstad (over 70 years)
Ole Mathias Sejersted (over 70 years)
Rolf Seljelid (over 70 years)
Torstein Sjøvold (over 70 years)
Otto A. Smiseth (over 70 years)
Johan Frederik Storm (over 70 years)
Jon Storm-Mathisen (over 70 years)
Marianne Thoresen (over 70 years)
Per Magne Ueland (over 70 years)
Lars Walløe (over 70 years)
Ivar Walaas (over 70 years)

Foreign
Richard Steven Blumberg
Emmanuelle Charpentier
Jennifer A. Doudna
Joel C. Glover
Kenneth Hugdahl
Sirpa T. Jalkanen
B. Pontus Persson
Lene Juel Rasmussen
Kristofer Rubin
Janna Saarela
Virginijus Siksnys
Ursula Sonnewald
Thomas C. Südhof
Menno Witter
Robert Zorec
Ingemar Björkhem (over 70 years)
Vilhelm A. Bohr (over 70 years)
Kenneth R. Chien (over 70 years)

Fitz-Roy Curry (over 70 years)
Dusan Ferluga (over 70 years)
Robert Fettiplace (over 70 years)

Georgii P. Georgiev (over 70 years)
Albert Gjedde (70+)
Gunnar Grant (over 70 years)
Sten Grillner (over 70 years)
Lars Åke Hanson (over 70 years)
Liv Kristin Hatle (over 70 years)
Albert James Hudspeth (over 70 years)
Hans Hultborn (over 70 years)
Tomas Hökfelt (over 70 years)

Eve Marder (over 70 years)
Georg Friedrich Melchers (over 70 years)
Michael Merznich (over 70 years)
Brenda Milner (over 70 years)
Enrico Mugnaini (over 70 years)
John O'Keefe (over 70 years)
Christine Petit (over 70 years)
Rem V. Petrov (over 70 years)
Marcus Raichle (over 70 years)
Pasko Rakic (over 70 years)
Eero Saksela (over 70 years)

Carla J. Shatz (over 70 years)
Shen Yucun (over 70 years)
Anthony Smith (over 70 years)
Johan Stenflo (over 70 years)
Prakash Narain Tandon (over 70 years)

Andrew Whitelaw (over 70 years)

Technology

Norwegian
Kristian Berg
Anders M. Dale
Thor Inge Fossen
Eivind Hovig
Inge Jonassen
Deborah Oughton

Alf Bjørseth (over 70 years)

Mai-Britt Hägg (over 70 years)
Tor Helleseth (over 70 years)
Torgeir Moan (over 70 years)
Odd Nakken (over 70 years)
Brit Salbu (over 70 years)
Hans Martin Seip (over 70 years)
Eiliv Steinnes (over 70 years)

Foreign
Maria Strømme
Ivar Giaever (over 70 years)
John Hirth (70+)
Darleane C. Hoffman (70+)

Letters

History

Norwegian
Astri Andresen
John Peter Collett
Narve Fulsås
Geir Hestmark
Guri Hjeltnes
Einar Lie
Leidulf Melve
Olav Njølstad
Veronique Pouillard
Hilde Sandvik
Øystein Sørensen
Hallvard Tjelmeland
Stein Tønnesson
Odd Arne Westad
Hilde Henriksen Waage
Håkon With Andersen (over 70 years old)
Sverre Bagge (over 70 years)
Edgeir Benum (over 70 years)
Ida Bull (over 70 years)
Hans Fredrik Dahl (over 70 years)
Ståle Dyrvik (over 70 years)
Knut Einar Eriksen (over 70 years)
Odd-Bjørn Fure (over 70 years)
Ole Kristian Grimnes (over 70 years)
Tore Grønlie (over 70 years)
Gro Hagemann (over 70 years)
Lars Ivar Hansen (over 70 years)
Knut Kjeldstadli (over 70 years)
Even Lange (over 70 years)
Geir Lundestad (over 70 years)
Jan Eivind Myhre (over 70 years)
Einar Niemi (over 70 years)
Helge Pharo (over 70 years)
Øystein Rian (over 70 years)
Anne-Lise Seip (over 70 years)
Jarle Simensen (over 70 years)
Rune Slagstad (over 70 years)
Rolf Tamnes (over 70 years)

Foreign
Patricia Clavin
Gunner Lind
Patrick Salmon
Kathleen Burk (over 70 years)
Anne Deighton (over 70 years)
Michael Drake (over 70 years)
Arthur E. Imhof (over 70 years)
Hans Christian Johansen (over 70 years)

Michael Jones (over 70 years)
Paul Gordon Lauren (over 70 years)
Odd S. Lovoll (over 70 years)
Christian Meier (over 70 years)
Göran B. Nilsson (over 70 years)
Bo Stråth (over 70 years)
Alexandre O. Tchoubarian (over 70 years)
Rolf Torstendahl (over 70 years)
Jay Murray Winter (over 70 years)
Eva Österberg (over 70 years)

Culture, aesthetics

Norwegian
Arne Bugge Amundsen
Jan von Bonsdorff
Brita Brenna
Annelin Eriksen
Thomas Hylland Eriksen
Stanley Hawkins
Helge Jordheim
Marianne Lien
Iver B. Neumann
Bjørnar Olsen
Dagfinn Skre
Brynjulf Stige
Kristin B. Aavitsland
Jon-Roar Bjørkvold (over 70 years old)
Barbara E. Crawford (70+)
Signe Horn Fuglesang (over 70 years)

Sidsel Helliesen (over 70 years)
Harald Herresthal (over 70 years)
Bjarne Hodne (over 70 years)
Signe Howell (over 70 years)
Arne Birger Johansen (over 70 years)
Asbjørn Klepp (over 70 years)
Siri Skjold Lexau (over 70 years)
Hans-Emil Lidén (over 70 years)
Øivind Lunde (over 70 years)
Magne Malmanger (over 70 years)
Marit Melhuus (over 70 years)
Per Jonas Nordhagen (over 70 years)

Even Ruud (over 70 years)
Staale Sinding-Larsen (over 70 years)
Bergljot Solberg (over 70 years)
Hjalmar Torp (over 70 years)
Arvid O. Vollsnes (over 70 years)
Marit Werenskiold (over 70 years)
Unni Wikan (over 70 years)

Foreign
Penelope Harvey
Christopher Henshilwood
Bente Knold Kiilerich
Lena Liepe

Mieke Bal (over 70 years old)
John Bergsagel (70+)
Katalin Biró-Sey (over 70 years)
Barbara Crawford (over 70 years)
Patrick Dinslage (over 70 years)
Owain Edwards (over 70 years)
Kirsten Hastrup (over 70 years)
Lotte Hedeager (over 70 years)
Lise Bender Jørgensen (over 70 years)
Erik Kjellberg (over 70 years)

Friedhelm Krummacher (over 70 years)

Saphinaz-Amal Naguib (over 70 years)
Valentino Pace (over 70 years)
Heinrich W. Schwab (over 70 years)
Nils Storå (over 70 years)
Jan Svanberg (over 70 years)
David Wilson (over 70 years)

Philosophy, psychology

Norwegian
Herman Wright Cappelen
Unn Falkeid
Anders Martin Fjell
Andreas Føllesdal
Olav Gjelsvik
Kristin Gjesdal
Vibeke Grøver
Thomas Kjeller Johansen
Bruno Laeng
Øystein Linnebo
Michael Morreau
Ole Frithjof Norheim
Bjørn Torgrim Ramberg
Camilla Serck-Hanssen
Arne Johan Vetlesen
Margarete Erika Vollrath
Kristine B. Walhovd
Merete Glenne Øie
Jon Elster (over 70 years old)
Dagfinn Føllesdal (over 70 years)
Torgrim Gjesme (over 70 years)
Robert Alastair Hannay (over 70 years)
Jon Hellesnes (over 70 years)
Tore Helstrup (over 70 years)
Svein J. Magnussen (over 70 years)
Ivar Reinvang (over 70 years)
Nils Roll-Hansen (over 70 years)
Bjørn Rishovd Rund (over 70 years)
Gunnar Skirbekk (over 70 years)
Jan Smedslund (over 70 years)
Jon Martin Sundet (over 70 years)
Karl Halvor Teigen (over 70 years)
Svenn Torgersen (over 70 years)

Foreign
Christian Beyer
Sigrid Blömeke
Eyjólfur K. Emilsson
Christel Fricke
Steven Pinker
Thomas Pogge
Agustín Rayo
Tong Shijun
Timothy Williamson
Henry E. Allison (over 70 years old)
Julia Annas (over 70 years)
Lars Bergström (over 70 years)
Gail S. Goodman (over 70 years)
Paul L. Harris (over 70 years)
Jennifer Hornsby (over 70 years)
Andrew J. I. Jones (over 70 years)
Anthony Kenny (over 70 years)
Saul Kripke (over 70 years)
Patricia K. Kuhl (over 70 years)
Andrew N. Meltzoff (70+)
Onora O'Neill
Charles Dacre Parsons (over 70 years)

John R. Perry
Dag Prawitz (over 70 years)
Peter Railton (70+)
Samuel Scheffler (over 70 years)
Colwyn Trevarthen (over 70 years)

Literature

Norwegian
Per Thomas Andersen
Kjersti Bale
Erik Bjerck Hagen
Frode Helland
Jon Haarberg
Ingunn Lunde
Toril Moi
Ellen Mortensen
Tore Rem
Tone Selboe
Liv Bliksrud (over 70 years old)
Per Buvik (over 70 years)
Jostein Børtnes (over 70 years)
Erik Egeberg (over 70 years)
Karin Gundersen (over 70 years)
Jorunn Hareide (over 70 years)
Karin M. Holter (over 70 years)
Jakob Lothe (over 70 years)
Stein Haugom Olsen (over 70 years)
Hans H. Skei (over 70 years)
Åsfrid Svensen (over 70 years)

Foreign
Charles Ivan Armstrong
Robert Crawford
Annegret Heitmann
Johnny Kondrup
Stuart Sillars
Terence Cave (over 70 years old)

André Guyaux (over 70 years)
Jeremy M. Hawthorn (over 70 years)

Arne Melberg (70+)
Mitsuya Mori (over 70 years)
Mary Kay Norseng (over 70 years)
Vésteinn Ólason (over 70 years)
Fritz Paul (over 70 years)
James Phelan (over 70 years)
Janet Rasmussen (70+)
Sandra Saari (over 70 years)
Beatrice Sandberg (over 70 years)
Barbro Ståhle Sjönell (over 70 years)
Thure Stenström (over 70 years)

Helen Vendler (over 70 years)
Johan Wrede (over 70 years)

Philology, linguistics

Norwegian
Ante Aikio
Kjersti Fløttum
Dag Trygve Haug
Laura Janda
Terje Lohndal
Anastasia Maravela
Kjell Johan Sæbø
Marit Westergaard
Øivind Andersen (over 70 years old)
John Ole Askedal (over 70 years)
Synnøve des Bouvrie (over 70 years)
Leiv Egil Breivik (over 70 years)
Bernt Brendemoen (over 70 years)
Jens Erland Braarvig (over 70 years)
Tove Bull (over 70 years)
Helge Dyvik (over 70 years)
Jan Terje Faarlund (over 70 years)
Jan Ragnar Hagland (over 70 years)
Ernst Håkon Jahr (over 70 years)
Egil Kraggerud (over 70 years)
Elizabeth Lanza (over 70 years)
Fredrik Otto Lindeman (over 70 years)
Ole Henrik Magga (over 70 years)
Else Mundal (over 70 years)
Svein Karl Mønnesland (over 70 years)
Jan Erik Rekdal (over 70 years)
Magnus Rindal (over 70 years)

Kjell Ivar Vannebo (over 70 years)
Geirr Wiggen (over 70 years)
Kjell Aartun (over 70 years)

Foreign
Artemis Alexiadou
Monika Asztalos
Lutz E. Edzard
Stephen J. Harrison
Irene de Jong
Margaret Laing
Andrew R. Linn
Lars Boje Mortensen
Robert Nedoma
Guðrún Nordal
Maria Polinsky
Roumyana Slabakova
Wim Michiel Vandenbussche
Michael Patrick Barnes (over 70 years old)
Michael Benskin (70+)
Henning Bergenholtz (over 70 years)

Helmut Birkhan (over 70 years)
Kurt Braunmüller (70+)
Tatiana Chernigovskaya (70+)
Östen Dahl (70+)
François-Xavier Dillmann (70+)

Cathrine Fabricius Hansen (over 70 years)
Christoph Harbsmeier (over 70 years)
William Hardcastle (over 70 years)
Lars Heltoft (over 70 years)

Merle Horne (70+)
Anthony B. Hunt (over 70 years)

Minna Skafte Jensen (over 70 years)
Ebbe Egede Knudsen (over 70 years)
Hans Christer Laurén (over 70 years)
Jørn Lund (70+)
Marianne Mithun (70+)
Hugo J. C. Montgomery (over 70 years)

Simo Parpola (over 70 years)
Stanislaw Puppel (70+)
Bo Ralph (over 70 years)
Suzanne Romaine (over 70 years)
Pekka Sammallahti (70+)

Anna-Brita Stenström (over 70 years)
Sven Teleman (over 70 years)

Peter Trudgill (over 70 years)
Boris Uspenskij (over 70 years)
Rainer Voigt (over 70 years)

Jurisprudence

Norwegian
Giuditta Cordero-Moss
Svein Eng
Hans Petter Graver
Trude Haugli
Jørn Jacobsen
Ola Mestad
Dag Michalsen
Anna Nylund
Ole-Andreas Rognstad
Jens Edvin A. Skoghøy
Inger Berg Ørstavik
Ragna Aarli
Jan Fridthjof Bernt (over 70 years old)
Erik Magnus Boe (over 70 years)
Kirsti Strøm Bull (over 70 years)
Thor Falkanger (over 70 years)
Gudrun Holgersen (over 70 years)
Kai Krüger (over 70 years)
Erling Chr. Selvig (over 70 years)
Carsten Smith (over 70 years)
Eivind Smith (over 70 years)
Tone Sverdrup (over 70 years)
Geir Ulfstein (over 70 years)
Frederik Zimmer (over 70 years)
Magnus Aarbakke (over 70 years)

Foreign
Katja Franko
Xavier Philippe

Bertil Bengtsson (over 70 years)
Francis P. Delpérée (over 70 years)
Torgny Håstad (over 70 years)
Kirsten Ketscher (over 70 years)
Peter Christian Müller-Graff (over 70 years)
Stig Strömholm (over 70 years)
Kaarlo Tuori (over 70 years)
Jozef Van Langendonck (over 70 years)

Social sciences

Norwegian
Geir Asheim
Gunn Elisabeth Birkelund
Grete Brochmann
Alexander Wright Cappelen
Scott Gates
Kristian Skrede Gleditsch
Bård Harstad
Håvard Hegre
Steinar Holden
Cathrine Holst
Raino Malnes
Arne Mastekaasa
Lars Mjøset
Willy Pedersen
Trond Petersen
Bjørn Erik Rasch
Kjell Arne Røvik
Kjell G. Salvanes
Kjetil Storesletten
Kaare Strøm
Bertil Tungodden
Karen Helene Ulltveit-Moe
Ole T. Berg (over 70 years)
Ottar Brox (70+)
Stein Bråten (70+)
Tom Christensen (70+)
Vidar Christiansen (over 70 years)
Morten Egeberg (over 70 years)
Finn Ragnar Førsund (over 70 years)
Johan Galtung (over 70 years)
Nils Petter Gleditsch (over 70 years)
Sigmund Grønmo (over 70 years)
Gunhild O. Hagestad (over 70 years)
Bernt Hagtvet (over 70 years)
Knut Heidar (70+)
Ottar Hellevik (over 70 years)
Gudmund Hernes (over 70 years)
Michael Hoel (over 70 years)
Aanund Hylland (over 70 years)
Stein Kuhnle (over 70 years)
Finn E. Kydland (over 70 years)
Ola Listhaug (over 70 years)
Per Lægreid (70+)
Knut Midgaard (over 70 years)
Kalle Moene (70+)
Victor D. Norman (over 70 years)
Johan P. Olsen (over 70 years)
Bernt P. Stigum (over 70 years)
Steinar Strøm (over 70 years)
Arild Underdal (over 70 years)
Øyvind Østerud (over 70 years)
Bernt Aardal (over 70 years)
Asbjørn Aase (70+)

Foreign
Peter Hedström
Richard Ling
Annick Prieur

Sabrina P. Ramet (70+)
Björn S. Stefánsson (70+)

Religion, theology

Norwegian
Knut Axel Jacobsen
Siv Ellen Kraft
Hugo Lundhaug
Håkan Rydving
Karl Olav Sandnes
Michael Stausberg
Aud Valborg Tønnessen
Jorunn Økland
Peder Johan Borgen (over 70 years)
Svein Aage Christoffersen (over 70 years)

Ingvild Sælid Gilhus (over 70 years)
Per Kværne (over 70 years)
Halvor Moxnes (over 70 years)
Oskar Skarsaune (over 70 years)
Gro Steinsland (over 70 years)
Magne Sæbø (over 70 years)
Einar Thomassen (over 70 years)

Foreign
Christoph Markschies
Samuel Rubenson
Jayne Svenungsson
David E. Aune (over 70 years old)
John Barton (70+)
Niels Jørgen Cappelørn (over 70 years)
Troels Engberg-Pedersen (over 70 years)

Nils Hellholm (over 70 years)

Ingun Montgomery (over 70 years)

Einar Sigurbjörnsson (over 70 years)
Rudolf Smend (over 70 years)
Reinhart Staats (over 70 years)

References